Polling is a municipality  in the Weilheim-Schongau district, in Bavaria, Germany.

It is the birthplace of the 12th century theologian Gerhoh of Reichersberg.

Geography
Polling lies in the region Bayerisches Oberland and belongs to the Landkreis Weilheim-Schongau. The river Ammer flows through the region with the Tiefenbach running through Polling. The municipality Polling consists of three subdivisions, Polling, Etting, and Oderding.

References

Weilheim-Schongau